Monastery of Dominican Sisters in Tarnobrzeg - Sisters of St. Dominic monastic-church building complex built in the 19th century in Tarnobrzeg (Wielowieś), Poland.  The monastery was founded by Mother Kolumba Białecka in 1861.  At the back the church is the grave of the founder.

See also
 Dominican Church and Convent of Assumption of Mary in Tarnobrzeg

Notes

Religious buildings and structures completed in 1861
Dominican monasteries in Poland
Buildings and structures in Tarnobrzeg
Roman Catholic churches in Tarnobrzeg
1861 establishments in the Austrian Empire
19th-century churches in Poland